Step on the Bass Line is an album by Bakithi Khumalo.

Track listing
 "Step on the Bass Line" – 	4:26
 "Talago" – 	3:29
 "Street Corner" – 	5:02
 "Bright Lights" – 	6:04
 "Takumba" – 	4:57
 "What's Going On" – 	4:17

References

	

1988 debut albums